The Metropolitan School District of Martinsville is a school district in Morgan County, Indiana, United States.

Schools

Preschools
STEM Sprouts Prekindergarten
Special Services Developmental Preschool
Title I Preschool

Elementary Schools ( Pre-Kindergarten – 4th Grade)
Brooklyn STEM Academy (2016 Certified STEM school by the Indiana Department of Education)
Centerton Elementary (2019 rated a 4 star school by the Indiana Department of Education)
Charles L. Smith Fine Arts Academy (Fine arts programming + state educational curriculum)
Green Township Elementary (Agriculture programming + state educational curriculum)
Poston Road Elementary (Spanish-immersion programming + state educational curriculum)
Paragon Elementary  (Project-based Learning programming + state educational curriculum))
South Elementary School of Communications

Intermediate School ( 5th – 6th Grades)
Bell Intermediate Academy

Middle School (7th – 8th Grades)
John R. Wooden Middle School

High School (9th – 12th Grades)
Martinsville High School (Received 'A' rating distinction from the Indiana Dept of Education)

Alternative Schools 
 Artesian Center for Excellence (A.C.E) located at Martinsville High School
 Night School for adults located at Martinsville High School

2018-2019 - District became a GAFE (Google Apps For Education) school, and is a Digital Citizenship Certified school through Common Sense Media.

2017-2018 - 1:1 digital education was implemented district wide. Every student received either an iPad or Chromebook to assist with their education.

2019 - the Indiana Student State Chess Championship held at Martinsville High School

2019 - Artesian Business PRIDE/ Governor's Work Certification program began

2018- Senior Success Center (SSC) added to Martinsville High School to assist seniors with preparation for college, vocational training or the workforce after high school.

Martinsville has many academic clubs.   The school's Business Professionals of America (BPA) club participates in state competitions.  The school has a class that produces an online publication, breakingblue.org.

References

Martinsville
Education in Morgan County, Indiana